= Ulya Norashen =

- Location within Azerbaijan
- Coordinates: 39°35′25″N 45°02′58″E
- Country: Azerbaijan
- Autonomous republic: Nakhchivan
- Time zone: UTC+4 (AZT)
  - Summer (DST): UTC+5 (AZT)

Ulya Norashen (also, Ul’ya Norashen and Norashen-Uliya) is a village in the Nakhchivan Autonomous Republic of Azerbaijan.
